Phassus chrysodidyma is a moth of the family Hepialidae. It is known to be from Mexico.

References

Moths described in 1915
Hepialidae